Atlas of the Heart is a 2021 non-fiction book written by Brené Brown. The book describes human emotions and experiences and the language used to understand them. It is a USA Today bestseller and was developed into a five-episode series for HBO Max. A portion of the series premiered at SXSW on March 11, 2022.

References 

2021 non-fiction books